The Castel C-311P was a training glider built in the early 1950s in France. It was a glider of high-wing monoplane configuration.

Specifications

References

Glider aircraft